Stenotrachelidae,  commonly called false longhorn beetles is a family of beetles in the superfamily Tenebrionoidea. They are native to the Holarctic region. The larvae feed on heavily decomposed wood, while the adults are likely short lived and probably feed on pollen.

Classification
The false longhorn beetles belongs to the large superfamily Tenebrionoidea. There are three subfamilies with about 6 genera and 20 species:
 Stenotrachelinae: Anelpistus, Scotodes, Stenocephaloon and Stenotrachelus
 Nematoplinae: Nematoplus 
 Cephaloinae: Cephaloon

References

Tenebrionoidea
Beetle families